Frain Kalan is a village in the mandal of Narwana, in Jind district in the Indian state of Haryana.

Villages in Jind district